Route 321 is a regional road in Quebec, Canada, that consists of two unconnected sections: one in Papineau Regional County Municipality that runs from Papineauville to Duhamel, and a second section of the road goes from Nominingue to L'Ascension in the Antoine-Labelle Regional County Municipality; there's 67 to 72 km in between (depending on the route).

The portion north of Chénéville in Papineau RCM is still unmarked on some maps, but it is signed on the road, and is very sinuous. On most of the Chénéville-Duhamel part, it is impossible to reach the 90 km/h speed. In fact it is most of the time a 50–70 km/h speed limit road. It is frequented by campers who go to the Lac Simon recreational center during the summer.

Papineau section

Antoine-Labelle section

See also
 List of Quebec provincial highways

References

External links 
 Official Transports Quebec Map 
 Route 321 on Google Maps

321